Alex Santos Araújo (born 19 December 1993), commonly known as Alex Santos or just Alex, is a Brazilian professional footballer who plays as a forward for Maruinense.

Career

Coritiba
Alex Santos made his senior league debut for Coritiba on 8 July 2012 in his side's 3–1 loss to São Paulo.

Red Bull Brasil
On 31 July 2013, Alex Santos joined Red Bull Brasil on loan. He made his debut on 31 August 2013, playing the whole match in his side's 1–0 loss to Itunao in the Copa Paulista.

AFC United
On 14 February 2014, Alex Santos joined AFC United on loan. He made his league debut on 4 May 2014, playing the whole match in his side's 1–0 win over Huddinge.

Guaratinguetá
In August 2015, Alex Santos joined  Campeonato Brasileiro Série C side Guaratinguetá. He made his debut on 5 September, playing 59 minutes in his side's 2–1 win over Londrina.

Career statistics

A.  The "Other" column constitutes appearances and goals (including those as a substitute) in the Copa Paulista

References

External links

Living people
1993 births
Association football forwards
Brazilian footballers
Campeonato Brasileiro Série A players
Coritiba Foot Ball Club players
Red Bull Brasil players
AFC Eskilstuna players
Expatriate footballers in Sweden
Brazilian expatriate footballers
Campeonato Brasileiro Série D players
Brazilian expatriate sportspeople in Sweden
Guaratinguetá Futebol players
Campeonato Brasileiro Série C players
Foz do Iguaçu Futebol Clube players
Associação Cultural e Desportiva Potiguar players